Edward Bruce Douglas (November 6, 1886 – February 6, 1946) was an American sculptor. His work was part of the sculpture event in the art competition at the 1936 Summer Olympics.

References

1886 births
1946 deaths
20th-century American sculptors
20th-century American male artists
American male sculptors
Olympic competitors in art competitions
People from Cedar Rapids, Iowa